Astou Ngom (born 6 March 1994) is a Senegalese footballer who plays as a forward for AS Cherbourg Football and the Senegal women's national team.

Club career
Ngom has played for ASC Médiour in Senegal and for AS Beauvais Oise and Cherbourg in France.

International career
Ngom capped for Senegal at senior level during the 2014 Africa Women Cup of Nations qualification.

References

External links

1994 births
Living people
People from Rufisque
Senegalese women's footballers
Women's association football forwards
AS Beauvais Oise players
AS Cherbourg Football players
Senegal women's international footballers
Senegalese expatriate footballers
Senegalese expatriate sportspeople in France
Expatriate women's footballers in France